Neville West (9 November 1933 – August 1987) was an Australian cricketer. He played nine first-class cricket matches for Victoria between 1962 and 1963.

See also
 List of Victoria first-class cricketers

References

External links
 

1933 births
1987 deaths
Australian cricketers
Victoria cricketers
Cricketers from Melbourne